Denis Zhivchikov (born 1 July 1976) is a Kazakhstani water polo player. He competed in the men's tournament at the 2000 Summer Olympics.

References

External links
 

1976 births
Living people
Kazakhstani male water polo players
Olympic water polo players of Kazakhstan
Water polo players at the 2000 Summer Olympics